Przytoczno is a village in the administrative district of Gmina Jeziorzany, within Lubartów County, Lublin Voivodeship, in eastern Poland.

The village has a population of 1,021.

References

Przytoczno